Funa is a genus of sea snails, marine gastropod mollusks in the family Pseudomelatomidae.

Species
Species within the genus Funa include:
 Funa asra Kilburn, 1988
 Funa cretea Li B.Q., Kilburn & Li X.Z., 2010
 Funa fourlinniei Bozzetti, 2007
 Funa fraterculus Kilburn, 1988
 Funa hadra Sysoev & Bouchet, 2001
 Funa jeffreysii (E. A. Smith, 1875)
 Funa laterculoides (Barnard, 1958)
 Funa latisinuata (Smith E. A., 1877)
 Funa spectrum (Reeve, 1845) (nomen dubium)
 Funa tayloriana (Reeve, 1846)
 Funa theoreta (Melvill, 1899)
Species brought into synonymy
 Funa flavidula (Lamarck, 1822): synonym of Clathrodrillia flavidula (Lamarck, 1822)
 Funa formidabilis (Hedley, 1922): synonym of Inquisitor formidabilis Hedley, 1922

References

External links
 
 Bouchet, P.; Kantor, Y. I.; Sysoev, A.; Puillandre, N. (2011). A new operational classification of the Conoidea (Gastropoda). Journal of Molluscan Studies. 77(3): 273–308

 
Pseudomelatomidae
Gastropod genera